Michael McGreevey (born February 7, 1948) is an American actor and screenwriter. He starred in several Walt Disney films as a young actor and later became a writer for the Fame TV series. He is the son of Emmy Award-winning television and film screenwriter John McGreevey.

Career
Michael McGreevey's first major role was as young cabin boy Chip Kessler in the 1959–61 TV series Riverboat. It starred Darren McGavin as the captain of a riverboat on the Mississippi River during the 1830s. In a 2015 interview, McGreevey confirmed the rumored friction between McGavin and his co-star Burt Reynolds: "They were just two very different personalities. I think that Burt was insecure. It was his first job in Hollywood and Darren was a very polished actor. It was Darren's show really--he was Captain Holden. I think Burt was a little jealous of Darren and they clashed quite a bit. What finally happened was that Burt left the show. But I loved them both. Darren was very much a father figure for me and Burt was like a big brother. He had been a football player at Florida State and I was impressed with that because I was into football. The first football I ever got--in fact, I've still got it--he got me. We used to play catch. I still see Burt every . He still says: 'Don't tell people you were only 11 years old when we were on Riverboat.'"

Throughout the 1960s and early 1970s, McGreevey appeared in numerous episodes of Walt Disney's Wonderful World of Color and in Disney's Dexter Riley film series: The Computer Wore Tennis Shoes (1969), Now You See Him, Now You Don't (1972), and The Strongest Man in the World (1975). Set at fictional Medfield College, these three films featured Kurt Russell as college student Dexter Riley and McGreevey as his friend Richard Schuyler. McGreevey also appeared as a different character in the Disney films Snowball Express (1972) and The Shaggy D.A. (1976).

In addition to his Disney roles, McGreevey appeared as guest star in numerous television series, such as The Virginian, Bonanza, and Route 66. He also starred opposite Sally Field, Kirk Douglas, Robert Mitchum, and Richard Widmark in the 1967 western The Way West, which was based on an A. B. Guthrie, Jr. novel. He played a young pioneer named Brownie Evans, who marries Sally Field's character.

In 1978, after studying film at UCLA, Michael McGreevey collaborated with his father, John McGreevey, on the script for the 1978 made-for-TV movie Ruby and Oswald: "In reality, the movie, although it's called Ruby and Oswald, is a three-way depiction of those four days in Dallas where we cut back and forth between the documentary footage of Kennedy and the recreated story with Ruby and Oswald. Dad and I both knew a man named Alan Landsburg, who had done a lot of documentaries. We went to him with the project first and he knew Mel Stuart, who had done an Academy Award-winning documentary called Four Days in November (1964). So, Mel was attached to direct it and we went into CBS and sold it right away as a three-hour special event movie. I was very proud of that movie; it was very well done."

McGreevey subsequently wrote episodes of TV series such as The Waltons; Quincy, M.E.; and Fame. He eventually became a script editor and then creative consultant for Fame. In 1984, he received an Emmy nomination for Outstanding Writing in Children's Programming for co-writing the ABC Afterschool Special "The Celebrity and the Arcade Kid". In 2015, he co-wrote the feature-length documentary Earl Hamner Storyteller, which focused on the life and career of The Waltons creator Earl Hamner, Jr.

Filmography

Film appearances

Television appearances

References

External links
 
 

1948 births
American male child actors
American male screenwriters
Living people